Diego Martin is a Region of Trinidad and Tobago. The region has a land area of 127.53 km². Urban areas within the region include Carenage, Diego Martin, Maraval and parts of Saint James. The local government body is the Diego Martin Regional Corporation.

On Thursday 19 November 2020, while addressing the public on the re-opening of the Diego Martin South Community Centre, Prime Minister and MP for Diego Martin West Dr Keith Rowley announced that Diego Martin, along with Siparia, will be elevated to borough status in 2021.

Demographics

Ancestry

Elected Areas

 Alyce Glen/Petit Valley
 Glencoe/Goodwood/La Puerta
 Moka/Boissiere #2
 St. Lucien/Cameron
 Bagatelle/Blue Basin
 Covigne/Rich Plain
 Diamond Vale
 Cocorite/Petit Valley
 Belle Vue/Boisierre #1
 Chaguaramas/Point Cumana

References

 Local Government Corporations, from Nalis, the National Library and Information Service of Trinidad and Tobago.

https://newsday.co.tt/2020/11/24/mp-corporation-chair-optimistic-about-diego-martin-borough-status/

Regions of Trinidad and Tobago
Trinidad (island)